McMillan House may refer to:

McMillan House (Daphne, Alabama), listed on the National Register of Historic Places (NRHP) in Baldwin County
Robert McMillan House, Clarkesville, Georgia, listed on the NRHP in Habersham County
McMillan-Garrison House, Clarkesville, Georgia, listed on the NRHP in Habersham County
Samuel McMillan House, Shawhan, Kentucky, listed on the NRHP in Harrison County
McMillan House (Latta, South Carolina), listed on the NRHP in Dillon County
Alexander McMillan House, Knoxville, Tennessee, NRHP-listed
Clotworthy-McMillan House, Heber City, Utah, listed on the NRHP in Wasatch County
David McMillan House, Stevens Point, Wisconsin, listed on the NRHP in Portage County